Syria competed as Syrian Arab Republic in the 2017 Asian Indoor and Martial Arts Games held in  Ashgabat, Turkmenistan from September 17 to 27. Syria sent a delegation consisting of 28 competitors for the multi-sport event competing in 9 different sports.

Syrian team won a tally of 6 medals including a gold medal.

Participants

Medallists

References 

Nations at the 2017 Asian Indoor and Martial Arts Games
2017 in Syrian sport